Naděžda Synecká (23 August 1926 – 11 September 2021) was a Czech printmaker.

She continues to live and work in Prague. One of her prints is in the collection of the National Gallery of Art.

Synecká died on 11 September 2021, at the age of 95.

References

1926 births
2021 deaths
20th-century Czech printmakers
Women printmakers
20th-century Czech artists
20th-century printmakers
20th-century Czech women artists
21st-century Czech artists
21st-century printmakers
21st-century Czech women artists
Artists from Prague
Academy of Fine Arts, Prague alumni